Luke Williams is an Australian journalist. He has worked as a reporter for ABC Radio, written for The Sydney Morning Herald, The Guardian, Brisbane Times, Crikey, The Global Mail, The Weekend Australian and Eureka Street. He is the author of The Ice Age, an account of his experiences with addiction to crystal meth.

Works

References

External links
 Twitter page
 Facebook page

Living people
Australian journalists
Year of birth missing (living people)